Hans Ramberg (15 March 1917 – 7 June 1998) was a Norwegian-Swedish geologist. The mineral rambergite was named after him. He was a pioneer in tectonic modelling with a centrifuge.

Biography
He received his Ph.D from the University of Oslo in 1946. He subsequently worked at the University of Chicago (1948–1961) and at the Geophysical Laboratory  of the Carnegie Institution for Science (1952–1955) at the Universidade Federal de Ouro Preto (1960–1961) and for the rest of his career at the University of Uppsala (1961–1982), where he established the Hans Ramberg Laboratory. Together with his assistants and students, he simulated a variety of tectonic models with the centrifuge, which are summarized in his second book: Gravity; deformation and the Earth's crust. Until the end of his career, he was focused on explored the potential of numerical modelling in combination with analogue modelling.

Awards 
In 1967, he was elected a member of the Royal Swedish Academy of Sciences. He was awarded by the Royal Society of Sciences at Uppsala for the Celsius Gold Medal  (Celsiusmedaljen i guld)   in 1969, by the Geological Society of London the Wollaston Medal in 1972 and for the Grand Prize from the Royal Academy for Natural Sciences in Sweden 1973.  He received the Arthur L. Day Medal from the GSA in 1976 as well as the Arthur Holmes Medal awarded by the EGU in 1983.
He was awarded the Björkén Prize  (Björkénska priset) at Uppsala University in 1980.

References

1917 births
1998 deaths
20th-century Norwegian geologists
20th-century Swedish geologists
University of Oslo alumni
University of Chicago faculty
Academic staff of Uppsala University
Members of the Royal Swedish Academy of Sciences
Wollaston Medal winners
Norwegian emigrants to Sweden
Norwegian expatriates in the United States